Mrs. Brown, You've Got a Lovely Daughter is the name of the fourth UK and seventh US album released by the band Herman's Hermits. It was first released in the UK in August, 1968 and in the US in September, 1968. The album was also the soundtrack to the film of the same name, also released in 1968.

Track listing 

Bonus Tracks (2000 Repertoire Rerelease)
  "Regardez-Moi (Here Comes the Star)" (Johnny Young)
 "Years May Come, Years May Go" (Jack Fishman, Jean-Claude Massoulier, André Popp)
 "Smile, Please" (Anthony King, David Most, Peter Noone)
 "Bet Yer Life I Do" (Karl Green, Hopwood, Leckenby)
 "Searching for the Southern Sun" (Errol Brown, Tony Wilson)
 "Lady Barbara" (Giancarlo Bigazzi, Brown, Gaetano Savio, Wilson)
 "Don't Just Stand There" (King, Most, Noone, Harold Spiro)
 "Big Man" (Bruce Belland, Glen Larson)
 "Wings of Love" (Patrick Campbell-Lyons, Alex Spyropoulos)
 "Mum and Dad" (Peter Callander)

References 

Herman's Hermits albums
Albums produced by Mickie Most
1968 soundtrack albums
MGM Records soundtracks
EMI Records soundtracks
EMI Columbia Records soundtracks
Repertoire Records soundtracks
Musical film soundtracks
Comedy film soundtracks